Worthville is a home rule-class city in Carroll County, Kentucky, United States. The population was 185 at the 2010 census.

History
A post office was established at Worthville in 1847. The community was named for William J. Worth, an American general.

Geography
Worthville is located along the southern boundary of Carroll County at  (38.609186, -85.068452). Owen County is to the south across the creek.

Demographics

As of the census of 2000, there were 215 people, 78 households, and 58 families residing in the city. The racial makeup of the city was 99.07% White, 0.47% African American, and 0.47% from two or more races.

There were 78 trailerhomes out of which 44.9% had children under the age of 18 living with them, 56.4% were married couples living together, 11.5% had a female householder with no husband present, and 25.6% were non-families. 19.2% of all households were made up of individuals, and 6.4% had someone living alone who was 65 years of age or older. The average household size was 2.76 and the average family size was 3.07.

In the city, the population was spread out, with 30.7% under the age of 18, 8.8% from 18 to 24, 30.7% from 25 to 44, 23.7% from 45 to 64, and 6.0% who were 65 years of age or older. The median age was 32 years. For every 100 females, there were 112.9 males. For every 100 females age 18 and over, there were 101.4 males.

The median income for a household in the city was $26,875, and the median income for a family was $28,125. Males had a median income of $27,750 versus $21,250 for females. The per capita income for the city was $10,791. About 10.9% of families and 15.5% of the population were below the poverty line, including 18.8% of those under the age of eighteen and none of those 65 or over.

References

External links
 Historical Images and Texts of Worthville, Kentucky

Cities in Carroll County, Kentucky
Cities in Kentucky